Marloes Wittenberg (born August 31, 1983 in Boxtel) is a Dutch judoka.

Wittenberg won the third place in the Dutch Championships two times in a row. She was downed by a knee injury in December 2004. After recovering from this injury, she won the third place in the Dutch Championships again in 2008. Currently she is an English teacher at the Huygens Lyceum in Eindhoven .

External links
 

1983 births
Living people
Dutch female judoka
People from Boxtel
Sportspeople from North Brabant
21st-century Dutch women